Der Bergdoktor is a German-Austrian medical drama television series, broadcast in 96 episodes between 1992 and 1997. The series is set in the fictional town of Sonnenstein in Tyrol; the real filming location is Wildermieming.

See also
List of German television series
Der Bergdoktor

External links
 

German drama television series
1992 German television series debuts
1997 German television series endings
German medical television series
Austrian medical television series
Television shows set in Austria
German-language television shows
Television shows based on German novels
Sat.1 original programming